The Face on the Bar Room Floor is a short film written and directed by Charles Chaplin in 1914. Chaplin stars in this film, loosely based on the poem of the same name by Hugh Antoine d'Arcy.

Synopsis
A devastated tramp (Charlie Chaplin) visits a crowd-filled bar and recounts the story of how he fell in love with a woman and then had her taken by a friend of his. Drunk, he keeps trying to draw the woman's picture on the floor with a piece of chalk, and gets into fights with other men in the process. He eventually passes out “dead drunk” (thus deviating from the poem, where the protagonist actually falls “dead”) at the end of the film.

According to Chaplin expert Gerald D. McDonald, "The subtitles of the film were lines from the poem, but the original verses were altered to match the Keystone credo that life is a funny game at best."

Reception
A reviewer for The Moving Picture World gave the film a favorable review, writing "Chas. Chaplain [sic] wins new laurels in the leading part. This is bound to please."

Cast
 Charles Chaplin - Artist/Tramp
 Cecile Arnold - Madeline
 Fritz Schade - Drinker
 Vivian Edwards - Model
 Chester Conklin - Drinker
 Harry McCoy - Drinker
 Hank Mann - Drinker
 Wallace MacDonald - Drinker
 Edward Nolan - Bartender

See also
The Face on the Barroom Floor (poem)
List of American films of 1914
Charlie Chaplin filmography

References

External links

1914 films
Silent American comedy films
American silent short films
American black-and-white films
Short films directed by Charlie Chaplin
1914 comedy films
1914 short films
Keystone Studios films
Films produced by Mack Sennett
Articles containing video clips
American comedy short films
Films based on poems
Mutual Film films
1910s American films